Operation Red Jericho (September 5, 2005) is the first novel in The Guild of Specialists trilogy by Joshua Mowll.

Plot summary 

In 1920, the heroes of the story Rebecca and Doug McKenzie, leave Shanghai aboard their uncle's ship Expedient, intent on discovering the whereabouts of their missing parents who have disappeared while on a secret mission to the deserts of Western China.
Faced with terrifying bloodthirsty pirates, submarines, and deadly torpedoes, their task quickly becomes a dangerous struggle to survive. Rebecca and Doug discover that the answers they seek lie in a tangle of mysterious age-old societies guarding ancient secrets, and particularly a strange and dangerous substance, known as Daughter Of The Sun, which lies at the heart of the mystery.

Reaction

Upon publication, Operation Red Jericho won the prestigious Poppy Red Award for Innovation in Children's Books at the British Book Trade Awards, (2006).

The book was well received, with Operation Red Jericho being the Sunday Times Children's Book of the Week during September 2005.

Reviews

“This is not just an adventure story; it is a designer object...” Sunday Times, London 25.09.05

“Mowll's genius, though, is in his clever mixing of old and new storytelling devices, and a clear and intelligent voice that should appeal to both girls and boys...” South China Morning Post, Hong Kong 28/08

Sequels

Operation Red Jericho was written as the first of a trilogy of books. A sequel, Operation Typhoon Shore was published in 2006, and the third book of the trilogy, Operation Storm City, was published in 2008.

External links
Official UK publisher's page on author
Official US publisher's page on author
Official French publisher's page on author

Sources 
About the author
ABC
Ebsco

2005 British novels
Novels by Joshua Mowll
British adventure novels
British young adult novels
Novels set in China
Fiction set in 1920
Walker Books books